The 2013 season was the Baltimore Ravens' 18th in the National Football League (NFL) and their sixth under head coach John Harbaugh. The Ravens entered the season as the defending Super Bowl champions from the previous year, but failed to improve on their 10–6 record from 2012, and missed the playoffs for the first time since 2007 and for the first time in the Harbaugh/Flacco era.

For the first time in franchise history, Ray Lewis was not on the roster, as he announced his retirement before the playoffs began the year prior. He retired as a champion of Super Bowl XLVII and was the last remaining player from the team's inaugural season. Lewis also helped the Ravens win Super Bowl XXXV over the New York Giants and is believed by many as the greatest Baltimore Raven of all time. Including Lewis, the team parted ways with a record eight starters from the Super Bowl-winning squad; no other defending Super Bowl champion had lost more than five.

2013 draft class

Notes
 The Ravens traded their original second- (No. 62 overall) and fifth- (No. 165 overall) round selections, along with one of their sixth-round selections (No. 199 overall; originally acquired in a trade that sent wide receiver Anquan Boldin to the San Francisco 49ers) to the Seattle Seahawks in exchange for the Seahawks' second-round selection (No. 56 overall).
 Compensatory selection.

Staff

Final roster

Preseason

Schedule

Regular season

Schedule

Note: Intra-division opponents are in bold text.
 Traditionally, the defending Super Bowl champions host the Kickoff Game. However, the Ravens opened on the road, due to a scheduling conflict with their Major League Baseball counterparts, the Baltimore Orioles.

Game summaries

Week 1: at Denver Broncos
NFL Kickoff game

Due to a conflict involving the Orioles' schedule, the Ravens opened the regular season on the road against the Broncos, the first time a defending Super Bowl champion team had done so since the Buccaneers in 2003 when they opened their regular season against the Eagles. This was be a rematch of the previous year's AFC Divisional game also known as the Mile High Miracle.

The Ravens drew first blood when Joe Flacco found Vonta Leach on a 2-yard touchdown pass to take the lead 7–0 in the first quarter for the only score of the period. The Broncos tied the game in the 2nd quarter with Peyton Manning finding Julius Thomas on a 24-yard pass to take the game to 7–7. The Ravens moved back into the lead when Ray Rice ran for a 1-yard touchdown to make the score 14–7. Peyton found Julius again on a 23-yard pass to make the score 14–14 for another tie before the Ravens kicker Justin Tucker nailed a 25-yard field goal to make the score 17–14 at halftime. In the 3rd quarter, the Broncos went right back to work as Peyton found Andre Caldwell on a 28-yard touchdown pass to take a 21–17 lead followed up with finding Wes Welker on 2 consecutive passes from 5 yards and 2 yards out for an increase in the lead first to 28–17 and then to 35–17. Later on in the quarter, Peyton found Demaryius Thomas on a 26-yard pass to increase the lead to 42–17. The Ravens tried to rally a comeback in the last quarter, with Flacco finding Marlon Brown on a 13-yard pass to shorten the Broncos' lead 42–24 followed up by Tucker's 30-yard field goal to make the score 42–27. However, the Broncos wrapped things up in the game when Peyton found D. Thomas again on a 78-yard pass to make the final score 49–27. The Ravens began their season 0–1 for the first time under John Harbaugh as head coach and Joe Flacco as their starter. They also lost their first regular season opening game since 2007 as well as becoming the 2nd straight defending Super Bowl champion team to lose their season opener.

Week 2: vs. Cleveland Browns

With their 11th straight win over the Browns, the Ravens improved to 1–1.

Week 3: vs. Houston Texans

Despite playing without star running back Ray Rice and a few other key starters, the Ravens were able to hold Houston to just 9 points, despite several trips on Baltimore's side of the field, including three red zone trips. With the win, the Ravens avenged their 30-point blowout last year to Houston, improved to 2–1 overall and 7–1 all time against the Texans, including playoffs.

Week 4: at Buffalo Bills

With the loss, the Ravens fell to 2–2.

Week 5: at Miami Dolphins

The Ravens won on the road for the first time in their 2013 season and improved to 3–2.

Week 6: vs. Green Bay Packers

With the loss, the Ravens fell to 3–3.

Week 7: at Pittsburgh Steelers

This was the first loss against the Steelers at Heinz Field since the 2010–11 NFL playoffs. With the loss, the Ravens headed into their bye week at 3–4.

Week 9: at Cleveland Browns

The Ravens lost their third straight game and fell to 3–5. It also snapped the team's 11-game winning streak over the Browns. Harbaugh and Flacco's records against the Browns dropped to 11–1.

Week 10: vs. Cincinnati Bengals

The Ravens were ahead 17–0 at half time, but the Bengals scored 17 unanswered points in the second half to force overtime. At the end of the fourth quarter, Andy Dalton threw a 51-yard Hail Mary that was first tipped by Ravens defender James Ihedigbo at the goal line, but eventually found A. J. Green in the end zone. However, about five minutes into overtime, Justin Tucker kicked the winning field goal (46 yards), and the Ravens improved to 4–5.

Week 11: at Chicago Bears

The game was interrupted in the first quarter for about two hours as a result of a torrential downpour at Soldier Field. After a slow start to the season, Ray Rice rushed for 131 yards and a touchdown. The Ravens were able to get the game to overtime, but the Bears won on a Robbie Gould field goal. The Ravens fell to 4–6.

Week 12: vs. New York Jets

The Ravens improved to 5–6.

Week 13: vs. Pittsburgh Steelers
Thanksgiving Day game

The Ravens won consecutive games for the first time since September and improved to 6–6. Additionally, they also improved to 2–0 in Thanksgiving Day games.

Controversy erupted in the third quarter when Steelers' head coach Mike Tomlin stood on the field along the his team's sideline as Jacoby Jones broke free on a kickoff return for a potential game breaking touchdown. Tomlin, with his back to the approaching play, appeared to glance over his shoulder then place his foot briefly onto the field as he jumped out of the way, causing Jones to veer inside where he was tackled. Several Ravens players claimed Tomlin had intentionally interfered with Jones; if officials had agreed, a touchdown could have been awarded to the Ravens based on the palpably unfair act. However, no penalty was called for interference or for standing in the white border area reserved for the officiating crew. On December 4, 2013, the NFL fined Tomlin $100,000.

Week 14: vs. Minnesota Vikings

In an eventful game, Vikings running back Adrian Peterson appeared to injure his ankle in the second quarter, and did not return to the game.

In the fourth quarter there were six lead changes, with five touchdowns scored in the final 125 seconds. Marlon Brown caught a nine-yard pass from Joe Flacco with four seconds remaining, and the Ravens improved to 7–6.

Week 15: at Detroit Lions

Justin Tucker scored six field goals, including a franchise record (and career long) 61-yard field goal with 38 seconds remaining in the fourth quarter. The Ravens won their fourth straight game and improved to 8–6.

Week 16: vs. New England Patriots

With the loss, the Ravens fell to 8–7 and back to seventh place in the playoff hunt, enabling their division rivals Bengals to secure the AFC North title.

Week 17: at Cincinnati Bengals

With this defeat, the Ravens were eliminated from post-season contention, assuring the NFL of a new Super Bowl Champion for the ninth straight year. The Ravens finished the season with a record of 8–8. This was also the last NFL game for running back Ray Rice as he was indefinitely suspended by the NFL and released by Ravens the following season.

Standings

Division

Conference

References

External links
 
 2013 Baltimore Ravens season at ESPN

Baltimore
Baltimore Ravens seasons
Raven
2010s in Baltimore